Jebha may refer to:

 El Jebha, town in Morocco
 Eritrean Liberation Front